Thomas Jefferson Hadley (1728 – September 1, 1781) was an American politician, settler and soldier in the American Revolutionary War. He played a prominent role in the signing of North Carolina's constitution in 1776.

Early life 
Thomas Jefferson Hadley was born in 1728, in New Castle, Delaware to Joshua Hadley, a Quaker originally from King's County (now County Offaly), Ireland, and Mary Rowland of Chester County, Pennsylvania. Prior to travelling to the United States, his family were members of the Quaker Meetinghouse in Moate, County Westmeath.

Career 
Hadley travelled to North Caroline with his father c1759, firstly settling in Bladen County, with the family becoming early settlers of Cross Creek. Hadley and his family were members of the Cane Creek Quaker community in the Piedmont region of North Carolina, however following his participation in the American Revolutionary War, he was excommunicated. During the war he reached the rank of captain.  In 1776 he represented Campbellton at the North Carolina Constitutional Convention.

Death and legacy 
Captain Hadley was killed in 1781 by a party of Tories under the command of Col. Hector McNeill at his home on Cape Fear River, on the night following the Battle of Cross Creek. His grandson Joshua Hadley became a settler in Texas, after becoming a recipient of a league of land in Anderson County.

References 

1728 births
1781 deaths
United States military personnel of the American Revolution
American people of Irish descent